The Saint Publius Parish Church, also known as the Floriana Parish Church is a Roman Catholic parish church in Floriana, Malta, dedicated to Saint Publius. It was constructed at several stages between the 18th and 20th centuries.

History
The first stone of the Church of St. Publius was laid down on 2 August 1733 by Bishop Paul Alphéran de Bussan, in the presence of Grand Master António Manoel de Vilhena. The sacristy was completed seven years later and it began to be used as a small church by the inhabitants of the then newly built suburb of Floriana. Construction was complete by 17 January 1768, when the relic of Saint Publius was brought to the church. The original design of the church is attributed to Francesco Marandon. The church was originally part of the parish of St. Paul of Valletta.

The façade of the church began to be rebuilt in 1771, and the dome was constructed in 1780. It became a vice-parish in 1776, and the church was consecrated by Bishop Vincenzo Labini on 20 March 1792. It became a parish in March 1844, after a decree was issued by Pope Gregory XVI.

The naves and an oratory were constructed between 1856 and 1861. A new façade was built by Nicola Zammit between 1884 and 1890. Two new bell towers were also built in 1889 and 1892. The church's interior was embellished in the late 19th and early 20th centuries.

Part of the church's façade and its dome were destroyed by aerial bombardment during World War II, when it was hit by bombs on 3–4 March and 28 April 1942 and sixteen people were killed. The nearby Sarria Church became a temporary parish church until the Church of St. Publius was reopened on 10 December 1944. Reconstruction of the church was carried out by the architect Gustav Vincenti, and it was completed in the late 1950s. The interior was embellished in the following decades, being fully completed in the early 1990s.

The church is scheduled as a Grade 1 national monument, and it is also listed on the National Inventory of the Cultural Property of the Maltese Islands.

Architecture
The façade of the Church of St. Publius consists of a neoclassical portico topped by a triangular pediment, flanked by a bell tower on either side. A statue of Christ the King stands on the top of the façade. The church has a cruciform plan with a dome and a richly decorated interior.

The altarpiece showing the martyrdom of Publius dates back to 1773, and it is the work of Antoine de Favray and his pupil Filippo Vincenzo Pace. The ceiling is decorated by paintings depicting Saint Paul's shipwreck and his stay in Malta. Several other paintings are also found in the church, including works by Giuseppe Calì, Emvin Cremona and many other artists.

The titular statue of St. Publius was completed in 1811 by the sculptor Vincenzo Dimech.

See also

Culture of Malta
History of Malta
List of churches in Malta
Religion in Malta

References

External links
Official website

Floriana
Limestone churches in Malta
18th-century Roman Catholic church buildings in Malta
19th-century Roman Catholic church buildings in Malta
20th-century Roman Catholic church buildings in Malta
National Inventory of the Cultural Property of the Maltese Islands
Roman Catholic churches completed in 1768
Neoclassical church buildings in Malta